Alan Harris Nevas (born March 27, 1928) is a former United States district judge of the United States District Court for the District of Connecticut.

Education and career
Born in Norwalk, Connecticut, Nevas received an Artium Baccalaureus degree from Syracuse University in 1949. He received a Bachelor of Laws from New York University School of Law in 1951. He was in private practice of law in Westport, Connecticut from 1951 to 1952. He was in the United States Army as a Sergeant First Class from 1952 to 1954. He was in private practice of law in Westport from 1954 to 1981. He was a member of the Connecticut House of Representatives from 1971 to 1977 and was a Republican. He was a Justice of the Peace in Westport from 1976 to 1981. He was the United States Attorney for the District of Connecticut from 1981 to 1985.

Federal judicial service
Nevas was nominated by President Ronald Reagan on September 9, 1985, to the United States District Court for the District of Connecticut, to a new seat created by 98 Stat. 333. He was confirmed by the United States Senate on October 16, 1985, and received commission on October 17, 1985. He assumed senior status on March 27, 1997, and retired on February 2, 2009.

Post judicial service
Following his retirement from the federal bench, Nevas became special counsel to Levett Rockwood P.C., a corporate law firm in Westport. Upon Levett Rockwood's combination with Verrill Dana, a leading New England regional law firm, in 2015, he became Senior Counsel to Verrill, where he continues to practice, primarily as an arbitrator and mediator. During his tenure at Levett Rockwood, Nevas was appointed by former Governor Jodi Rell to chair the state's investigation into the causes of the deadly February 7, 2010 explosion at the Kleen Energy power plant in Middletown, Connecticut, and to chair the committee that allocated $7.7 million in funds to families impacted by the December 14, 2012 Sandy Hook Elementary School shooting in Newtown, Connecticut.

References

Sources
 

|-

|-

|-

1928 births
Living people
Judges of the United States District Court for the District of Connecticut
Republican Party members of the Connecticut House of Representatives
New York University School of Law alumni
People from Norwalk, Connecticut
Military personnel from Connecticut
Syracuse University alumni
United States Attorneys for the District of Connecticut
United States district court judges appointed by Ronald Reagan
20th-century American judges